The 1989 Nations Cup was held in Gelsenkirchen. Medals were awarded in the disciplines of men's singles, ladies' singles, pair skating, and ice dancing.

Results

Men

Ladies

Pairs

Ice dancing

External links
 Skate Canada results

Nations Cup, 1989
Bofrost Cup on Ice